Big Red Group is an Australian amusement and experience company founded in 2017, that owns a variety of brands that all focus around the entertainment industry. Based in Sydney, the list of brands the corporation owns include Adrenaline, Experience Oz, Experience Oz Local Agent, and RedBalloon. According to Big Red Group, it owns some 10,000 experiences across Australia.

History
Big Red Group acquired RedBalloon and REDii, an experience-based rewards platform, in 2017. Big Red Group then added experience brands Adrenaline in 2018, Lime&Tonic in 2019, and Experience Oz and Experience Oz Local Agent in 2021. Big Red Group partnered with Destination Cairns Marketing in 2022 to increase growth in North Queensland's tourism sector in a joint venture.

Awards
Big Red Group has been given several nominations and recognitions in human resources. Big Red Group has gained finalist nominations from The Australian Financial Review (AFR) and Human Resources Director Magazine (HRD). Employee benefits, such as the opportunity for employees to work anywhere from anywhere for 30 days had the company recognised by Fast Company Brands that Matters 2021, shortlisted AFR's Best Places to Work in 2022 and Most Innovative Companies 2021.

Companies
Big Red Group is the holding company for a portfolio of experience businesses:
 Adrenaline - Focused on rides like hot air balloons and other experiences like whale watching.
 Experience Oz - Focuses on cruises, theme parks, and zoos/aquariums.
Experience Oz Local Agent - Ticketing system owned by Experience Oz that allows users to purchase tickets to experiences.
 Lime&Tonic - Focuses on food, wine, and spa treatments.
 RedBalloon - Focuses on gift-centered experiences, like cruises, flying, skydiving, etc.

References

External links 
 Big Red Group company site

Holding companies established in 2017
Holding companies of Australia